Jordan House is a historic home located near Windsor, Bertie County, North Carolina. It was built about 1738, and is a one-story, Quaker plan brick dwelling with a gable roof.  It features two interior T-stack end chimneys.  The interior was destroyed by fire in 1928.

It was added to the National Register of Historic Places in 1971.

References

Houses on the National Register of Historic Places in North Carolina
Houses completed in 1738
Houses in Bertie County, North Carolina
National Register of Historic Places in Bertie County, North Carolina